Indrahar (इन्द्रहार) Pass is a mountain pass in the Dhauladhar range of the Himalayas. It is part of a very popular trekking route from Dharamshala. It attracts substantial tourist traffic during the trekking season between April – October.

Indrahar Pass Trail
The trekking trail to Indrahar pass starts from Galu Devi temple above Dharamkot village near Dharamsala and passes through the camping ground of Triund, Ilaqua/Laka Got, and Lahesh Caves. On the other side of the pass, the camping sites include Chhata caves at 3242 metres and Kuarsi village in Chamba at 2,260 metres.

The trek starts from McLeod Ganj and continues as follows:
 McLeod Ganj main market (1750m) to Galu Devi temple at Upper Dharamkot (2100m) | 2 km | 1-2 hour walk OR a 45-minute cab ride
 Galu Devi temple (2100m) to Triund (2825m) | 2-3.5 hrs walk (mix of easy and uphill)
 Triund (2825m) to Snowline Cafe | 1-2 hour uphill walk
 Snowline Cafe to Ilaqua Got (grazing grounds) | 1 hour easy walk (mostly flat/downhill)
 Ilaqua to Lahesh cave (3300 m) 2-3 hours. 
 Lahesh Cave to Indrahar Pass (4300m) | 2–6 hours of a steep climb

See also 

 List of mountain passes of India

References  

 https://www.travelfoxx.com/things-you-should-know-about-indrahar-pass-trek/==External links==
 http://www.trekkinginindia.com/trekking-in-himachal/indrahar-pass-trek.html
 http://wikimapia.org/9720400/Indrahar-Pass-Crossing-over-to-Chamba
 http://www.indiatrekkings.com/indrapasstrek.html
 https://web.archive.org/web/20110717094924/http://www.trekhimachal.com/newsite/index.php?option=com_content&view=article&id=71&Itemid=75
 http://indianexpress.com/article/lifestyle/mcleodganj-travel-diary-the-trek-to-lahesh-caves-could-be-tricky-for-first-timers/

Mountain passes of Himachal Pradesh
Geography of Kangra district
Geography of Chamba district